Deh Nush (also Romanized as Deh Nūsh) is a village in Darbandrud Rural District, in the Central District of Asadabad County, Hamadan Province, Iran. At the 2006 census, its population was 279, in 64 families.

References 

Populated places in Asadabad County